Carinodrillia elocata is an extinct species of sea snail, a marine gastropod mollusk in the family Pseudomelatomidae, the turrids and allies.

Subspecies : Carinodrillia elocata meta W.P. Woodring, 1928 from the Bowden Formation, Jamaica.

Description
The length of the shell attains 27 mm.

Distribution
This extinct species was found in Pliocene strata of Jamaica, in Miocene to Pliocene strata of the Dominican Republic and in Miocene strata of Panama; age range: 7.246 to 2.588 Ma.

References

External links
 Worldwide Mollusc Species Data Base : Carinodrillia elocata
 Gardner J.A. (1937). The molluscan fauna of the Alum Bluff Group of Florida. Part VI. Pteropoda, Opisthobranchia and Ctenobranchia (in part). United States Geological Survey Professional Paper. 142-F: 251–435, pls 37–48

elocata
Gastropods described in 1922